Todd Harbour (born March 24, 1959) is a retired American middle and long-distance runner.

Career
Harbour competed collegiately for Baylor University, and later was the head track and field and cross-country coach at for 22 years, before retiring in 2021. In 1979, he won a silver medal in the 1500 metres at the Pan American Games in San Juan, Puerto Rico. He currently holds the collegiate record in the outdoor mile, when he ran 3:50.34 in Oslo in 1981 during his senior year. During college, he was also a five-time All-American and won eight individual Southwest Conference titles. Harbour was inducted into the Baylor Athletic Hall of Fame, the Southwest Conference Hall of Fame and the Rio Grande Valley Hall of Fame. He competed professionally for Nike from 1981 to 1987, and ran 54 sub-4-minute miles during his career.

References

1959 births
Living people
American male middle-distance runners
American male long-distance runners
Athletes (track and field) at the 1979 Pan American Games
Baylor Bears men's track and field athletes
People from Cameron County, Texas
Track and field athletes from Texas
Pan American Games silver medalists for the United States
Pan American Games medalists in athletics (track and field)
Medalists at the 1979 Pan American Games